The Izyaslav class were a class of destroyers built for the Baltic Fleet of the Imperial Russian Navy. They were modified versions of the  built in Russia with the assistance of the French company Augustin Normand. These ships fought in World War I, the Russian Civil War, the Estonian War of Independence, and World War II.

Design
The ships were an enlarged version of previous designs with a longer raised forecastle, and Frahm-type anti-rolling tanks. An extra  gun was added and the number of torpedo tubes reduced.

Ships
These ships were built by Bocker and Lange in Reval, Estonia. The ships were delayed due to ordering machinery from Switzerland which was embargoed on the outbreak of World War I. New machinery was ordered from Britain.

Bibliography

External links

Destroyer classes